Speea is a genus of Chilean plants in the onion subfamily within the Amaryllis family.

Species
Both known species are native to central Chile.
Speea humilis (Phil.) Loes. ex K.Krause
Speea triloba Ravenna

References

Amaryllidaceae genera
Endemic flora of Chile